Waihōpai may refer to:

New Zealand:
Waihopai River (Marlborough), in the north of the South Island
Waihopai Valley, Marlborough
Waihopai Station, a satellite monitoring station in the Waihopai Valley, often referred to as Waihopai spy base
Waihopai River (Southland), in the south of the South Island
Waihōpai, the Māori name of Invercargill, Southland
Waihopai, Invercargill, suburb of Invercargill
Waihopai AFC, an association football club in Invercargill

Other:
"Waihopai", a track by American band Tortoise on their box set A Lazarus Taxon